Homaloxestis eccentropa is a moth in the family Lecithoceridae. It was described by Edward Meyrick in 1934. It is found in southern China.

References

Moths described in 1934
Homaloxestis
Moths of Asia